This is a list of minor planets named after rivers, organized by continent.

Africa 
 1032 Pafuri (Pafuri Triangle, South Africa)
 1264 Letaba (Letaba River, South Africa)
 1305 Pongola (Pongola River, South Africa)
 1323 Tugela (Tugela River, South Africa)
 1490 Limpopo (Limpopo River, South Africa)
 35295 Omo (Omo River, aka Omo-Bottego, Ethiopia)

Asia 
 732 Tjilaki (Cilaki River, West Java, Indonesia)
 1089 Tama (Tama River in Tokyo)
 1090 Sumida (Sumida River in Tokyo)
 1266 Tone (Tone River; in the Kantō region of Japan)
 4941 Yahagi (Yahagi River, Aichi, Japan)
 6247 Amanogawa (Amanogawa River on Hokkaidō, Japan)
 10143 Kamogawa (Kamo-gawa or Kamo River in Kyoto Prefecture)
 12757 Yangtze (Yangtze River)
 13096 Tigris (Tigris, Turkey, Syria, Iraq)
 15804 Yenisei (Yenisei, Siberia, Russia)
 16563 Ob (river in central Asia)
 21182 Teshiogawa (Teshio River on Hokkaidō, Japan)
 24701 Elyu-Ene (Evenk name of the Lena River, Siberia)
 79152 Abukumagawa (Abukuma River (Abukuma-gawa), Japan)
 100936 Mekong (in China and Indochina)
 110297 Yellowriver (Yellow River)
 32858 Kitakamigawa (Kitakamigawa River, Japan)
 190057 Nakagawa (Nakagawa River, Tokushima prefecture, Japan)

Europe 
 364 Isara (Isère River)
 1149 Volga (Volga River)
 1223 Neckar (Neckar River in Germany)
 1302 Werra (Werra River in Germany)
 1381 Danubia (River Danube)
 1488 Aura (Aura river)
 1508 Kemi (Finnish town and river)
 1929 Kollaa (Kollaa River, Russia)
 2081 Sázava (Sázava River)
 2123 Vltava (Vltava River)
 2321 Lužnice (Lužnice River)
 2390 Nežárka (Nežárka River)
 3016 Meuse (Meuse River, France, Belgium, and the Netherlands)
 4405 Otava (Otava River)
 4698 Jizera (Jizera River)
 4702 Berounka (Berounka River)
 4801 Ohře (Ohře River)
 6501 Isonzo (Isonzo/Soča River, Italy/Slovenia)
 6522 Aci (Jaci River near Acireale, Italy)
 7174 Semois (Semois)
 7669 Malše (Malše River)
 9578 Klyazma (Klyazma River)
 10038 Tanaro (Tanaro River, the longest river of Piedmont, Italy)
 10735 Seine (Seine River, France)
 11194 Mirna (Mirna River, Croatia)
 11302 Rubicon (Rubicon River, Italy, famously crossed by Julius Caesar)
 11400 Raša (Raša River, Croatia)
 11875 Rhône (Rhône, Swiss/French river)
 13031 Durance (Durance River, France)
 13032 Tarn (Tarn (river), France)
 13033 Gardon (Gardon River, Gard, France)
 13121 Tisza (Tisza River)
 13122 Drava (Drava River)
 16481 Thames (Thames River)
 16689 Vistula (Latin name of Vistula River)
 21290 Vydra (Vydra River)
 40092 Memel (the other name of Neman River)
 151430 Nemunas (Nemunas River, the largest river in Lithuania)
 216451 Irsha (Irsha River, Ukraine)
 237845 Neris (Neris River, Belarus)
 251001 Sluch (Sluch River, Ukraine)
 363582 Folpotat (Folpotat, a small river in an isolated Jura valley, Switzerland).

North America 
 1345 Potomac (Potomac River)

South and Central America
1042 Amazone (Amazon River)
1779 Paraná (Paraná River, a river in south Central South America)

See also 
 List of minor planets
 List of minor planets named after animals and plants
 List of minor planets named after people
 List of minor planets named after places
 List of named minor planets (numerical) and (alphabetical)
 Meanings of minor planet names

References 
 Jet Propulsion Laboratory. "JPL Small-Body Database Browser" http://ssd.jpl.nasa.gov/sbdb.cgi (accessed 6 April 2012).

 
Rivers